Marc Cavosie (born August 6, 1981) is an American former professional ice hockey player who last played for the Tohoku Free Blades of the Asia League Ice Hockey. He was selected by the Minnesota Wild in the 4th round (99th overall) of the 2000 NHL Entry Draft.

Playing career
Prior to turning professional, Cavosie attended the Rensselaer Polytechnic Institute where he played three seasons with the RPI Engineers men's ice hockey team which competes in NCAA's Division I in the ECAC conference.

After two seasons with the Oji Eagles in the Asia League Ice Hockey, Cavosie returned to Europe and signed a one-year deal with SC Bietigheim-Bissingen of the German DEL2 on August 2, 2013. Due to a foot injury, Cavosie was never registered to play with the Steelers and ultimately returned to the Asian League with the Tohoku Free Blades.

Career statistics

Regular season and playoffs

International

Awards and honors

References

External links 

1981 births
Albany River Rats players
American men's ice hockey forwards
Binghamton Senators players
Columbia Inferno players
HK Acroni Jesenice players
Houston Aeros (1994–2013) players
Ice hockey players from New York (state)
Lake Erie Monsters players
Living people
Minnesota Wild draft picks
Oji Eagles players
Philadelphia Phantoms players
Reading Royals players
Rögle BK players
RPI Engineers men's ice hockey players
Sportspeople from Albany, New York
Tohoku Free Blades players
AHCA Division I men's ice hockey All-Americans
American expatriate ice hockey players in Sweden
American expatriate ice hockey players in Slovenia
American expatriate ice hockey players in Japan